Taper may refer to:
 Part of an object in the shape of a cone (conical)
 Taper (transmission line), a transmission line gradually increasing or decreasing in size
 Fishing rod taper, a measure of the flexibility of a fishing rod
 Conically tapered joints, made of ground glass, commonly used in chemistry labs to mate two glassware components fitted with glass tubings 
 Luer taper, a standardized fitting system used for making leak-free connections between slightly conical syringe tips and needles
 Tapered thread, a conical screw thread made of a helicoidal ridge wrapped around a cone
 Machine taper, in machinery and engineering
 Mark Taper Forum, a theatre in the Los Angeles Music Center
 A ratio used in aeronautics (see Chord (aeronautics))
 A thin candle
 Philadelphia Tapers (also New York Tapers and Washington Tapers), a defunct professional basketball team
 Taper (cymbal), the reduction in thickness of a cymbal from center to rim
 Taper pin, used in manufacturing
 Taper insertion pin, used in body piercing
 Taper (concert), a person who records audio concerts, usually via portable setup
 Taper, a type of men's haircut (see crew cut)

See also
 Tapering (disambiguation)
 Tapper (disambiguation)
 Tapir (disambiguation)